The New York City Omnibus Corporation (NYCO, later Fifth Avenue Coach Lines, Inc.) ran bus services in New York City between 1926 and 1962. It expanded in 1935/36 with new bus routes to replace the New York Railways Corporation streetcars when these were dismantled. It further expanded with the acquisition of the Fifth Avenue Coach Company from The Omnibus Corporation in 1954. NYCO was renamed the "Fifth Avenue Coach Lines, Inc." in 1956, becoming bankrupt in 1962, after which operations were taken over by the Manhattan and Bronx Surface Transit Operating Authority.

History
The New York City Omnibus Corporation was formed in 1926 with John A. Ritchie as President. Richie was also president of The Omnibus Corporation founded a year earlier.

The company introduced new bus lines to replace the streetcar lines being withdrawn by the New York Railways Corporation in 1935/36, which The Omnibus Corporation also owned.

In 1954, the company purchased the Fifth Avenue Coach Company from The Omnibus Corporation and renamed itself as "Fifth Avenue Coach Lines, Inc." on May 14, 1956. They also acquired the Third Avenue Railway-owned Surface Transportation Corporation on December 17 that same year, and created an operating subsidiary, Surface Transit, Inc., to administer their routes.

The company went bankrupt in 1962 and the services were taken over by the Manhattan and Bronx Surface Transit Operating Authority.

Routes
The routes that were operated by the New York City Omnibus Corporation are listed below.

References

External links
Bus maps circa 1940s

Surface transportation in Greater New York
Transport companies established in 1926
Transport companies disestablished in 1962
Bus transportation in New York City
Defunct companies based in New York (state)
Defunct public transport operators in the United States
1926 establishments in New York City
1962 disestablishments in New York (state)